This is a ranking of total career IFSC victories obtained in the annual IFSC Climbing World Cup and the biennial IFSC Climbing World Championships, which were organized by the International Climbing and Mountaineering Federation (from 1989 to 2006), and the International Federation of Sport Climbing (since 2007).

Climbers are ranked based on the total number of victories (i.e. won the biennial Championship or won the overall annual Cup) obtained throughout their competition climbing career across all four disciplines: Lead climbing, Bouldering, Speed climbing, and the Combined discipline, in these two events.

Comparison with IFSC rankings
This list is distinct from the IFSC World Rankings, which are computed separately for each of the four disciplines (i.e. Lead, Bouldering, Speed), and are based on the sum of all results, and not just victories, achieved by each athlete in the last twelve months. Most career IFSC gold medals is a metric that is tracked by the climbing media, as was widely reported in the case of Janja Garnbret, however, as the annual World Cup consists of several individual events, for which gold medals are awarded, the number of "victories" is usually less than the total number of "gold medals".

Tabulation
Athletes who have won at least won one gold medal in an World Cup series or a World Championship are listed in the tables below. They are ranked based on the number of victories (T) they obtained throughout their career across all disciplines.

Separate scores are provided for each of the two types of competition (1 = World Cups and 2 = World Championships), and the four disciplines (L = Lead climbing, B = Bouldering, S = Speed climbing, and C = Combined disciplines). Therefore, L1 is the number of Lead climbing World Cups awarded to each athlete.

For each athlete, the total number of victories (T) is obtained by adding together their total victories in the eight events:
T = L1 + B1 + S1 + C1 + L2 + B2 + S2 + C2
Partial totals are also provided for each discipline and competition. For instance, the total number of victories obtained in Lead climbing by each athlete is:
L = L1 + L2
and the total number of World Cups awarded to each athlete is:
T1 = L1 + B1 + S1 + C1

Results for Men 
Sortable table, pre-sorted by total number of victories (T), updated on November 14, 2022.

Results for Women 
Sortable table, pre-sorted by total number of victories (T), updated on November 14, 2022.

See also 
List of grade milestones in rock climbing
History of rock climbing
 International Federation of Sport Climbing
 IFSC Climbing World Cup
 IFSC Climbing World Championships

References 

IFSC Climbing World Cup
IFSC Climbing World Championships
Climbing competitions
IFSC Climbing World Championships medalists
IFSC Climbing World Cup overall medalists